Vaclovas Krutinis  (September 27, 1948 Vilnius, Lithuania – October 30, 2013 Vilnius) was a Lithuanian sculptor.

He was President of the Lithuanian Artists' Association from 1998 to 2008.

See also
List of Lithuanian painters

References

Universal Lithuanian Encyclopedia

Lithuanian sculptors
1948 births
2013 deaths
Artists from Vilnius